Mount Buchanan is a small unincorporated community in Prince Edward Island, Canada. Located southeast of Charlottetown, it is part of the Community of Belfast.

References

Communities in Queens County, Prince Edward Island